The 1994 ATP Tour World Championships (also known for the singles event as the IBM-ATP Tour World Championship for sponsorship reasons) were tennis tournaments played on indoor carpet courts. It was the 25th edition of the year-end singles championships, the 21st edition of the year-end doubles championships, and both were part of the 1994 ATP Tour. The singles event took place at the Frankfurt Festhalle in Frankfurt, Germany, from November 14 through November 20, 1994, and the doubles event in Jakarta, Indonesia, from November 21 through November 27, 1994.

Champions

Singles

 Pete Sampras defeated  Boris Becker, 4–6, 6–3, 7–5, 6–4
 It was Pete Sampras' 10th title of the year, and his 31st overall. It was his 2nd year-end championships title.

Doubles

 Jan Apell /  Jonas Björkman defeated  Todd Woodbridge /  Mark Woodforde 6–4, 4–6, 4–6, 7–6(7–5), 7–6(8–6).

External links
 Official website

 
ATP Tour World Championships
1994
Tennis tournaments in Germany
Tennis tournaments in Indonesia
1994 in German tennis
Sports competitions in Frankfurt
1994 in Indonesian tennis
Sports competitions in Jakarta
1990s in Jakarta
1990s in Frankfurt
November 1994 sports events in Asia
November 1994 sports events in Europe